The National Society (Church of England and Church in Wales) for the Promotion of Education, often just referred to as the National Society, and since 2016 also as The Church of England Education Office (CEEO) is significant in the history of education in England and Wales. It promotes church schools and Christian education in line with the established church. Historically it was in strong competition with the nonconformist organization British and Foreign School Society. Both promoted the monitorial system, whereby a few paid teachers worked with senior students who in turn taught the junior students. The National Society was strongly supported by the Anglican clergy, Oxford and Cambridge universities, and the established church. The nonconformist Protestants were in strong opposition.

History
It was founded on 16 October 1811 as the "National Society for Promoting the Education of the Poor in the Principles of the Established Church in England and Wales".  The Church of England, as the established religion, set out as the aim of the new organisation that "the National Religion should be made the foundation of National Education, and should be the first and chief thing taught to the poor, according to the excellent Liturgy and Catechism provided by our Church."  One of the principal founders was Joshua Watson.   The formation and early operation of the National Society was the origin of the liberal education policy founded in the 1830s.

Historically, schools founded by the National Society were called National Schools, as opposed to the non-denominational "British schools" founded by the British and Foreign School Society.

Following the success of the Sunday school movement, the monitorial system of education was developed almost simultaneously by Dr Andrew Bell and Joseph Lancaster. Dr Bell was a clergyman in the Church of England and conducted an experiment with a monitorial school in Madras which he described in An Experiment in Education in 1797. Using this system and in opposition to the nondenominational Lancastrian Society, the Church of England set up the National Society for Promoting the Education of the Poor in the Principles of the Established Church. This monitorial system would dominate popular education for 50 years.

References

Further reading
  H. J. Burgess. Enterprise in Education: The Story of the Work of the Established Church in the Education of the People prior to 1870 (London, 1958); 
 H. J. Burgess and  Paul Welsby, Short History of the National Society: 1811-1961 (1961)
 Akira Iwashita,  "Politics, state and Church: forming the National Society 1805–c. 1818." History of Education 47.1 (2018): 1–17. 
Early education for the poor
John Lawson and Harold Silver, A Social History of education in England (1973)

External links
 National Society website
 The archives of the Society are held at the Church of England Record Centre

Education in England
Education in Wales
Church of England societies and organisations
Religious organizations established in 1811
1811 establishments in England
Religious education in the United Kingdom